Events from the year 1344 in Ireland.

Incumbent
Lord: Edward III

Events

February 10 – Ralph d'Ufford is appointed Justiciar.
April 20 – custody of the lands of the late Earl of Ormond is granted to the Earl of Desmond.
April 24 – the 'Bonnaght', a treaty between Richard, Duke of York, Earl of Ulster and Henry, Son of Eoghan O'Neill, is sanctioned in Ulster.
June 3 – Justiciar is ordered to resume and regrant all abandoned and waste lands.
July 21 – Justiciar campaigns in south Leinster and Munster.
October 21 – Pope Clement VI issues dispensation for marriage between Maurice fitz Thomas FitzGerald, Earl of Kildare, and Joan, daughter of the Earl of Desmond.
James Bermingham became Bishop of Killala
John Morice appointed Lord Chancellor of Ireland

Births

Deaths

References

"The Annals of Ireland by Friar John Clyn", edited and translated with an Introduction, by Bernadette Williams, Four Courts Press, 2007. , pp. 240–244.
"A New History of Ireland VIII: A Chronology of Irish History to 1976", edited by T. W. Moody, F.X. Martin and F.J. Byrne. Oxford, 1982. .
http://www.ucc.ie/celt/published/T100001B/index.html
http://www.ucc.ie/celt/published/T100005C/index.html
http://www.ucc.ie/celt/published/T100010B/index.html

 
1340s in Ireland
Ireland
Years of the 14th century in Ireland